Arthur Hornbui Bell (February 14, 1891 – March 1973) was an attorney and the Grand Dragon of the Ku Klux Klan in New Jersey.

Early years
He was born on February 14, 1891, in Manhattan, New York City to William John Bell of England. Arthur was a member of a vaudeville team known as "Bell and Bell", after marrying Leah Hamlin (1895–1951). They went to Europe after World War I in 1919 to entertain the troops, "for the boys," as a members of the "Y" and "Overseas Theater League under Y.M.C.A.". Leah Bell rode a unicycle and Art and Leah had ventriloquism dummies shows. Arthur Bell is known to have been a member of the "Over There" theatre organized under Benjamin Franklin Keith and visited Belgium, England, France, and the Netherlands. Art and Leah are also listed in the official record of the "Over There" theater as vaudeville players.

Klan years
Around 1922, Bell became the Grand Dragon of the Ku Klux Klan for New Jersey. In 1925 he wrote the introduction to Alma White's pro-Klan book The Ku Klux Klan in Prophecy:
This book brings out vividly the titanic struggle now taking place, not only in the United States, but over the entire world, and while at the present time the battle raging has not reached the point where bullets, swords and poison gas are the reasons used, the time will soon arrive when the Roman Catholic craving for world-power will, if not checked, cause a revival of a religious war that will be far more disastrous than the late World War. Bishop White deserves the highest praise for her work on this truly wonderful book of "light" and it is hoped that it may reach out into the minds of Protestants and Catholics alike and bring them to a sense of realization as to where this great un-American movement to make the world Catholic will ultimately end.

In 1926, he wrote the introduction to Klansmen: Guardians of Liberty and he also headed a group that converted Camp Evans into a Klan resort. In the same year, he was paid $1,596.96 by the King Kleagle of the Ku Klux Klan in New Jersey, to save the Kleagle's son, Roscoe Carl Ziegler, from charges of embezzlement. In 1928, he called the New York Governor, Al Smith unfit to lead. In 1940, James Colescott had him removed as head of the Klan of New Jersey. He was also vice president of the German American Bund. His first wife Leah spoke at many Klan events. In 1940 he was investigated by the Dies Committee for plans to merge the KKK and the Nazi movement. Bell was interviewed by the Military Intelligence Service and investigated for "disaffection" in 1942. The case was closed, "no further investigation appears warranted," and the report was sent to J. Edgar Hoover.  Later in life he had changed his outlook and said: "I think tolerance should be taught in the public schools."

He died in March 1973 in New Jersey.

Publications
Ku Klux Klan Or the Knights of Columbus Klan: America Or Rome (1921)
Klansmen: Guardians of Liberty (1926) by Alma White – he wrote the introduction

References

American people of English descent
Ku Klux Klan Grand Dragons
People from Bloomfield, New Jersey
People from Long Branch, New Jersey
German American Bund
1973 deaths
1891 births
Old Right (United States)
Former Ku Klux Klan members